Each September, some 1,000 young women between the ages of 17 to 21 interview for the honor of serving as a member of the Tournament of Roses Royal Court. The Pasadena Tournament of Roses administers a selection process to determine which greater Pasadena-area young women will have the honor of being crowned Queen of the Tournament of Roses, or more commonly known as "Rose Queen". In addition to one Rose Queen, six Rose Princesses will also be selected to make up the Royal Court. To be eligible for the Royal Court, applicants must be a female resident of the Pasadena City College district, be currently enrolled as a 12th grade senior in high school or as a full-time college student (minimum 12 units) in any accredited school or college in the Pasadena City College district, possess at least a 2.0 grade point average in the current year's and previous year's course work, and be at least 17 years of age by December 31 of the current year and not more than 21 years of age before January 5 of the next year. Each applicant also must never have been married or have had a marriage annulled, have no children, and must agree not to marry prior to January 5 of the next year.

Background
The Royal Court will then ride on a specially-designed float in the Rose Parade, and become ambassadors of the Tournament of Roses, mainly during its duration and prelude. The Royal Court members will attend over one hundred events in the Southern California area and preside over the Rose Bowl Game. In celebration of their achievements, Royal Court members receive scholarship money, wardrobe, and other benefits. The crown, provided and exclusively created by Mikimoto, is valued at $100,000.

Bella Ballard, from the Ogburn Online School, was named the 104th Rose Queen on October 25, 2022, at Tournament House. The Royal Court was announced on October 3, 2022. Other members of the court are Salia Baligh, Alverno Heights Academy; Sahanna Rajinikanthan, Arcadia High School; Zoe Denoncourt, John Marshall Fundamental High School, Michelle Cortez-Peralta, Pasadena High School; Uma Wittenberg, La Canada High School; and Adrian Crick, Sequoyah High School.

For the 2022 Rose Parade, Nadia Chung (La Cañada High School) is the Rose Queen. The princesses are Jeannine Briggs (John Marshall Fundamental High School), Ava Feldman (South Pasadena High School), Abigail Griffith (Pasadena High School), Swetha Somasundaram (Arcadia High School), McKenzie Street (Flintridge Sacred Heart Academy), and Jaeda Walden (La Cañada High School). The coronation of the new queen was held on October 26, 2021, at Tournament House.

There was no queen crowned for 2021 because of the COVID-19 pandemic. That marked the first time in 92 years that no Rose Queen was crowned.

For the 2019 Rose Parade, Louise Siskel from Sequoyah High School was selected as the 101st Rose Queen, and the first Jewish woman to wear the crown, during the Rose Queen Announcement and Coronation Ceremony on October 23, 2018, at the Pasadena Playhouse. Members of the 2019 Royal Court are: Lauren Michele Baydaline and Micaela Sue McElrath (Westridge School), Ashley Symone Hackett (John Muir High School), Rucha Kadam (La Canada High School), Sherry Xiaouri Ma (San Marino High School) and Helen Susan Rossi (Flintridge Preparatory School).

2018 Royal Court: Isabella Marez (La Salle High School) was selected as the 2018 Rose Queen during the 100th Rose Queen Announcement and Coronation Ceremony on October 18, 2017, at the Pasadena Playhouse. Members of the 2018 Royal Court are: Julianne Lauenstein (La Cañada High School); Syndey Pickering (Arcadia High School); Savannah Bradley (Pasadena High School); Georgia Cervenka (La Cañada High School); Lauren Buehner (Arcadia High School); Alexandra Artura (Flintridge Sacred Heart Academy).

Victoria Cecilia Castellanos (Temple City High School) was selected as the 2017 Rose Queen during the 99th Rose Queen Announcement and Coronation Ceremony on October 20, 2016. Members of the 2017 Royal Court are Maya Khan and Lauren Emiko Powers (Arcadia High School), Audrey Cameron (Blair High School), Natalie Petrosian (La Canada High School), Autumn Marie Lundy (Polytechnic School) and Shannon Larsuel (Mayfield Senior School)

Erika Karen Winter (Flintridge Preparatory School) was selected as the 2016 Rose Queen during the 98th Rose Queen Announcement and Coronation Ceremony on October 22, 2015. Members of the 2016 Royal Court are Princess Bryce Marie Bakewell (Flintridge Sacred Heart Academy), Princess Donaly Elizabeth Marquez (Blair High School), Princess Natalie Breanne Hernandez-Barber (Alverno High School), Princess Rachelle Chacal Renee Liu (San Marino High School), Princess Regina Marché Pullens (Maranatha High School), and Princess Sarah Sumiko Shaklan (La Cañada High School).

Madison Triplett (John Marshall Fundamental High School) was selected as the 2015 Rose Queen during the 97th Rose Queen Announcement and Coronation ceremony on October 21, 2014. Members of the 2015 Royal Court are Princess Mackenzie Byers (Pasadena City College), Princess Gabrielle Current (Flintridge Sacred Heart Academy), Princess Veronica Mejia (Pasadena City College), Princess Bergen Onufer (Mayfield Senior School), Princess Simona Shao (Westridge School) and Princess Emily Stoker (Temple City High School), who were announced on October 6, 2014, at the Tournament House.

Ana Marie Acosta of Polytechnic School was crowned 2014 Rose Queen during the 96th Rose Queen Announcement and Coronation Ceremony on October 24, 2013. Members of the 2014 Royal Court are Princess Sarah Hansen (Pasadena City College), Princess Kayla Johnson-Granberry (Pasadena High School), Princess Jamie Kwong (La Salle High School), Princess Katherine Lipp (La Cañada High School), Princess Elyssia Widjaja (San Marino High School), and Princess Elizabeth Woolf (La Cañada High School).

Vanessa Manjarrez of Mayfield Senior School was named the 2013 Rose Queen on October 16, 2012. Members of the 2013 Royal Court include Princess Madison Teodo (La Cañada High School), Princess Sonia Shenoi (San Marino High School), Princess Kathryne Benuska (Maranatha High School), Princess Nicole Nelam (Pasadena High School), Princess Tracy Cresta (La Salle High School), and Princess Victoria McGregor (Flintridge Sacred Heart Academy).

Drew Helen Washington of Flintridge Sacred Heart Academy was crowned 2012 Rose Queen. Members of the 2012 Royal Court are Princess Sarah Nicole Zuno (Benjamin Franklin High School), Princess Cynthia Megan Louie (La Salle High School), Princess Morgan Eliza Devaud (La Cañada High School), Princess Kimberly Victoria Ostiller (Flintridge Preparatory School), Princess Hanan Bulto Worku (Pasadena High School), Princess Stephanie Grace Hynes (Maranatha High School).

Rose Queens

  1905: Hallie Woods (McConnell)
  1906: Elsie Armitage (Prizer)
  1907: Joan (Hadenfeldt) Woodbury
  1908: May Sutton (Bundy)
  1909-1910: No Queens
  1911: Ruth Palmer
  1912: No Queen
  1913: Jean P. French (Queen) & Drummond Harrison (King)
  1914: Mabel Seibert (Loughery)
  1915-1922: No Queens
  1923: May McAvoy (Cleary)
  1924: No Queen
  1925: Margaret (Mann) Scoville
  1926: Fay Lanphier
  1927: No Queen
  1928: Harriet Sterling
  1929: No Queen
  1930: Holly Halsted (Balthis)
  1931: Mary Lou Waddell
  1932: Mryta Olmsted (Poulson)
  1933: Dorothy Edwards (Conlon)
  1934: (Loretta) Treva Scott (Oxford)
  1935: Muriel Cowan (Moore)
  1936: Barbara Nichols (Field)
  1937: Nancy Bumpus (Urquhart Buck)
  1938: Cheryl Walker (Etzell Coumbe Andrews)
  1939: Barbara Dougall
  1940: Margaret Huntley (Main)
  1941: Sally Stanton (Rubsamen)
  1942: Dolores Brubach
  1943: Mildred Miller
  1944: Naomi Riordan
  1945: Mary Rutte (Wallace)
  1946: Patricia Auman (Richards)
  1947: Norma Christopher (Winton)
  1948: Virginia Goodhue 
  1949: Virginia Bower (Nichols)
  1950: Marion Brown
  1951: Eleanor Payne
  1952: Nancy Thorne
  1953: Leah Feland (Cullen)
  1954: Barbara Schmidt (Mulligan)
  1955: Marilyn Smuin (Martell)
  1956: Joan Culver (Warren)
  1957: Ann Mossberg (Hall)
  1958: Gertrude Wood
  1959: Pamela Prather
  1960: Margarethe Bertelson (Knoblock)
  1961: Carole Washburn
  1962: Martha Sissell
  1963: Nancy Davis (Maggio)
  1964: Nancy Kneeland (Kish)
  1965: Dawn Baker
  1966: Carole Cota (Gelfuso)
  1967: Barbara Hewitt (Laughray)
  1968: Linda Strother
  1969: Pamela Anicich
  1970: Pamela Dee Tedesco
  1971: Kathleen Arnett (Miller)
  1972: Margolyn Johnson
  1973: Salli Noren
  1974: Miranda Barone
  1975: Robin Carr
  1976: Anne Martin
  1977: Diane Ramaker (Stimson)
  1978: Maria Caron
  1979: Catherine Gilmour
  1980: Julie Raatz
  1981: Leslie Kawai
  1982: Katherine Potthast
  1983: Suzanne Gillaspie
  1984: Ann Marie Colborn
  1985: Kristina Smith
  1986: Aimee Richelieu
  1987: Kristin Harris
  1988: Julie Myers
  1989: Charmaine Shryock
  1990: Yasmine Delawari
  1991: Cara Rullman
  1992: Tannis Turrentine
  1993: Liana Carisa Yamasaki
  1994: Erica Brynes
  1995: Aliya Haque
  1996: Keli Hutchins
  1997: Jennifer Halferty
  1998: Purdy Tran
  1999: Christina Farrell
  2000: Sophia Bush
  2001: Michelle Jacobs
  2002: Caroline Hsu
  2003: Alexandra Wucetich
  2004: Megan Chinen
  2005: Ashley Moreno
  2006: Camille Clark
  2007: Mary McCluggage
  2008: Dusty Gibbs
  2009: Courtney Chou Lee
  2010: Natalie Innocenzi
  2011: Evanne Friedmann
  2012: Drew Helen Washington
  2013: Vanessa Manjarrez 
  2014: Ana Marie Acosta
  2015: Madison Elaine Triplett
  2016: Erika Karen Winter
  2017: Victoria Cecilia Castellanos
  2018: Isabella Marie Marez
  2019: Louise Siskel
  2020: Camille Kennedy
  2021: No Queen (cancelled by COVID-19 pandemic)
  2022: Nadia Chung 
  2023: Bella Ballard

References

External links

 Tournament of Roses Royal Court
 Rose Queens in 2001 at latimes.com

Tournament of Roses
Beauty pageants in the United States
1905 establishments in California
American debutantes
History of women in California